You Gotta Problem with Me is the twenty-third solo album by Julian Cope, released in 2007.

Released across two CDs of 27 and 29 minutes respectively, You Gotta Problem with Me covers subject matter from corporate greed to celebrity culture, religion, misogyny, homophobia, and the Iraq War. Musically, the album ranges from garage rock on songs like the title track and "Peggy Suicide is a Junkie" to acoustic ballads like "Woden" and "A Child is Born in Cerrig-Y-Drudion."

Track listing

Personnel
Musicians
Julian Cope — vocals, guitar, bass, Mellotron, Moog, Korg synthesizer
Anthony "Doggen" Foster — guitar, bass, harmonica
Ian "Mister E." Bissett — drums
Donald Ross Skinner — programming, drums, guitar
Chris Olley — Korg synthesizer, programming
Technical
Julian Cope — producer, directed by
Terry Dobbin — recorded by
Chris Olley — recorded by, mastering engineer
Donald Ross Skinner — recorded by
Benji Bartlett — photography
Lady V — photography
Christopher Patrick "Holy" McGrail — design

References

External links
You Gotta Problem with Me on Discogs.com

2007 albums
Julian Cope albums